Klaus-Robert Müller (born 1964 in Karlsruhe, Germany) is a German computer scientist and physicist, most noted for his work in machine learning and brain–computer interfaces.

Career
Klaus-Robert Müller received his Diplom in mathematical physics and PhD in theoretical computer science from the University of Karlsruhe. Following his Ph.D. he went to Berlin as a postdoctoral fellow at GMD (German National Research Center for Computer Science) Berlin (now part of Fraunhofer Institute for Open Communication Systems), where he started building up the Intelligent Data Analysis (IDA) group.

From 1994 to 1995 he was a research fellow at Shun'ichi Amari's lab at the University of Tokyo.

1999 Müller became an associate professor for neuroinformatics at the University of Potsdam, transitioning to the full professorship for Neural Networks and Time Series Analysis in 2003. Since 2006 he holds the chair for Machine Learning at the Technical University Berlin.

Since 2012 he holds a distinguished professorship at Korea University in Seoul. He co-founded and is co-director of the Berlin Big Data Center (BBDC) of the Technical University Berlin.

As of 2017, 29 former doctoral or postdoctoral researchers of Klaus-Robert Müller have become full professors themselves. Bernhard Schölkopf and Alexander J. Smola were supervised by him as members of his research group.

Since 2020 he is director of the Berlin Institute for the Foundations of Learning and Data (BIFOLD), a German National AI Competence Center, and director of the European Laboratory for Learning and Intelligent Systems (ELLIS) unit Berlin.

In 2020/2021 he spent his sabbatical at Google Brain as a Principal Scientist.

Research

Müller has contributed extensively to several major interests of machine learning, including support vector machines (SVMs) and kernel methods, and artificial neural networks. He pioneered applying new methods of pattern recognition in domains like brain–computer interfaces, using them for patients with Locked-in syndrome. He is one of the leading computer scientists affiliated with Germany.

His current research interests include:
 Statistical learning theory (Support Vector Machines, Deep Neural Networks, Boosting)
 Learning of non-stationarity data
 Fusion of structured heterogeneous multi-modal data, co-adaptation
 Applications: MEG, EEG, NIRS, ECoG, EMG, Brain Computer Interfaces, computational neuroscience, computer vision, genomic data analysis, computational chemistry and atomistic simulations, digital pathology

Honours and awards

Klaus-Robert Müller was elected a fellow of the German National Academy of Sciences Leopoldina in 2012. In 2017 he was elected member of the Berlin-Brandenburg Academy of Sciences and Humanities and also external scientific member of the Max Planck Society. In 2021 he was elected member of the German Academy of Science and Engineering.

His work was honoured with several awards, including:
 2022, 2021, 2020, and 2019 Clarivate Highly Cited Researcher
 2017 Vodafone Innovations Award 2017
 2014 Science Prize of Berlin 2014 by the Governing Mayor of Berlin
 2014 European Research Council Panel Consolidator Grants
 2009 Best Paper award by IEEE Engineering in Medicine and Biology Society EMBS
 2006 SEL-ALCATEL Research Prize for Technical Communication
 1999 Olympus Award for Pattern Recognition

Books 
 with 
 with 
 with 
 with

References

External links
 
 

Artificial intelligence researchers
Machine learning researchers
Academic staff of the Technical University of Berlin
Academic staff of Korea University
German computer scientists
21st-century German physicists
Karlsruhe Institute of Technology alumni
Living people
1964 births
Members of the German Academy of Sciences Leopoldina